is a railway station in Yokogawa-cho, Nishi-ku, Hiroshima, Hiroshima Prefecture, Japan, operated by the West Japan Railway Company (JR West) and Hiroshima Electric Railway (Hiroden).

Lines
Yokogawa Station is served by the following lines:
 
  Sanyo Main Line
  
 Hiroshima Electric Railway
  Hiroden Yokogawa Line

Station layout

JR West

The Kabe Line and the Sanyō Main Line stop at the JR West Yokogawa Station. The Kabe Line has an island platform serving two tracks. The Sanyō Main Line has a side platform and an island platform serving three tracks. The center track of the Sanyō Main Line is not used during regular service. There is a railway junction east of the station, where the Kabe Line and the Sanyō Main Line merge.

There are two entrances to the JR West Yokogawa Station on the north and south sides of the station.

Platforms

Adjacent stations

Hiroshima Electric Railway

Yokogawa Station is the terminus station for the Hiroden Yokogawa Line, and is also the terminus station for Route 7 and Route 8. There is one island platform serving two tracks. It is located directly outside the south entrance of the JR West station. A large roof extending from the main station building covers the station platform and tracks. The station formerly had tram tracks between the JR West platforms, but these have since been removed.

Platforms

Adjacent stations

History

JR West
Yokogawa Station first opened on 25 September 1897 as part of the Sanyō Railway.

On 1 December 1906, Yokogawa Station was nationalized, becoming part of Japanese Government Railways (JGR).

The Kabe Line portion of the station opened on December 19, 1909.

With the privatization of Japanese National Railways (JNR) on 1 April 1987, the station came under the control of JR West.

Hiroshima Electric Railway

Opened "Yokogawa" and "Misasa" tram stops on November 1, 1917.
Renamed from "Misasa" to "Yokogawa" in 1926.
Removed the former "Yokogawa" tram stop on July 28, 1941.
Moved on July 19, 1951.
Renamed from "Yokogawa" to "Yokogawa Station" on November 1, 2001.
Moved to the present place on March 27, 2003.

First bus service in Japan
On 5 February 1905, the first bus service in Japan began operating between Yokogawa and Kabe stations.

The first omnibus used in Japan is now housed in a display at the station.

Surrounding area
 National Route 54
Hiroshima Yokogawa Post Office
Ōta River

See also

 List of railway stations in Japan

References

External links
 JR West 

Railway stations in Hiroshima Prefecture
Railway stations in Japan opened in 1897
Kabe Line
Sanyō Main Line
Hiroshima City Network
Stations of West Japan Railway Company in Hiroshima city
Hiroden Yokogawa Line stations